Bagrou  is a town and commune in Mauritania.

Communes of Mauritania